Santiago 'Santi' Santos Andrés (born 1 March 1984) is a Spanish footballer who plays for Cultural y Deportiva Leonesa as a central defender.

Club career
Born in La Virgen del Camino, Castile and León, Santos started playing youth football with Real Oviedo. In 2002, he made his senior debuts, playing with the B-side in Tercera División.

In 2003 summer Santos first arrived in Segunda División B after signing with neighbouring Real Avilés, and contributed with 26 appearances and three goals in his only season with the Asturians. In the following years he only represented reserve teams, Celta de Vigo B and Real Valladolid B, and in 2008 joined Cultural y Deportiva Leonesa also in the third level.

On 17 July 2009, Santos signed with Segunda División club FC Cartagena. He made his professional debut on 3 September, starting in a 3–2 home win over Elche CF for the campaign's Copa del Rey.

In February 2010 Santos rescinded his link with the Murcians, returning to Cultural shortly after. He went on to resume his career in the lower divisions, starting with Real Unión and returning to Leonesa for a third stint.

References

External links

1984 births
Living people
Spanish footballers
Footballers from Castile and León
Association football defenders
Segunda División B players
Tercera División players
Real Oviedo Vetusta players
Real Avilés CF footballers
Celta de Vigo B players
Real Valladolid Promesas players
Cultural Leonesa footballers
FC Cartagena footballers
Real Unión footballers